Chris J. Riley (born December 8, 1973) is an American professional golfer and coach.

Riley was born in San Diego, California. He attended the University of Nevada, Las Vegas, where he became the first four-year All-American in any sport. In 1995 he played for the United States in the Walker Cup.

Riley turned professional in 1996 and spent time on the Nationwide Tour. He became a member of the PGA Tour in 1999 and made the top thirty on the money list in 2002 and 2003. His sole PGA Tour victory came at the 2002 Reno-Tahoe Open. He was a member of the losing 2004 United States Ryder Cup team and also played on a winning American team in that year's Tommy Bahama Challenge, which is an international match for pros aged 30 and under.

After his Ryder Cup appearance, Riley finished outside of the top 125 on the money list in both 2005 and 2006.  Riley last played a full PGA Tour season in 2010 and competes occasionally through Monday qualifying and past champion status. In 2007 he won the Rochester Area Charities Showdown at Somerby on the Nationwide Tour located in Byron, Minnesota.

He was ranked as high as 21st in the Official World Golf Ranking.

Riley was named the head men's golf coach at University of San Diego in June 2017.

Professional wins (2)

PGA Tour wins (1)

PGA Tour playoff record (1–1)

Nationwide Tour wins (1)

Nationwide Tour playoff record (1–0)

Results in major championships

CUT = missed the half-way cut
"T" = tied

Summary

Most consecutive cuts made – 5 (2004 PGA – 2006 PGA)
Longest streak of top-10s – 1 (twice)

Results in The Players Championship

CUT = missed the halfway cut
"T" indicates a tie for a place

Results in World Golf Championships

QF, R16, R32, R64 = Round in which player lost in match play
"T" = Tied

U.S. national team appearances
Amateur
Walker Cup: 1995

Professional
Ryder Cup: 2004

See also
1998 PGA Tour Qualifying School graduates
2008 PGA Tour Qualifying School graduates
2009 PGA Tour Qualifying School graduates

References

External links

American male golfers
UNLV Rebels men's golfers
PGA Tour golfers
Ryder Cup competitors for the United States
College golf coaches in the United States
Golfers from San Diego
Golfers from Nevada
Sportspeople from Las Vegas
1973 births
Living people